Clifton, Australia may refer to:
Clifton, Queensland, town and Shire south of Toowoomba, Queensland in Australia
Clifton Hill, Victoria, suburb of Melbourne, Victoria, Australia
Clifton, New South Wales, suburb of Wollongong, New South Wales
Clifton, Western Australia